Anthony Rhys Hartigan (born 27 January 2000) is an English professional footballer who plays as a central midfielder for EFL League Two club Mansfield Town.

Career

AFC Wimbledon 
Hartigan joined AFC Wimbledon aged 14, after being spotted playing for coaching company Pro Direct Soccer. He signed his first professional contract on his 17th birthday. On 8 August 2017, he made his debut in a 3–1 EFL Cup defeat to Brentford. Playing the full 120 minutes, with the game going to extra time, he became the first player to represent AFC Wimbledon born in the 2000s. He scored his first goal for Wimbledon in an EFL Trophy tie against Barnet on 29 August 2017.

On 15 April 2018, Hartigan was named the LFE Apprentice of the Year award for League One at the EFL Awards ceremony in London.

Following relegation, Hartigan was offered a new contract at the end of the 2021–22 season. On 5 July 2022 AFC Wimbledon announced that Hartigan had decided to leave the club following the expiry of his contract.

Newport County (loan) 
Hartigan joined League Two club Newport County on loan until the end of the 2020–21 season on 25 January 2021. He made his debut for Newport in the starting line up for the 2–1 defeat against Harrogate Town in League Two on 30 January 2021. Hartigan played for Newport in the League Two playoff final at Wembley Stadium on 31 May 2021 which Newport lost to Morecambe, 1–0 after a 107th minute penalty.

Mansfield Town
On 4 August 2022, Hartigan signed for League Two club Mansfield Town on a two-year contract, a compensation package being agreed with AFC Wimbledon on account of Hartigan's age.

Personal life

Hartigan is of Welsh descent through his great - grandmother.

Career statistics

References

External links 
 Anthony Hartigan profile at the official AFC Wimbledon website
 

2000 births
Living people
Footballers from Kingston upon Thames
English footballers
English people of Welsh descent
Association football midfielders
AFC Wimbledon players
Newport County A.F.C. players
Mansfield Town F.C. players
English Football League players